Kasur , is an administrative subdivision (tehsil) of Kasur District in the Punjab province of Pakistan. The city of Kasur is the headquarters of the tehsil.

Administration
The tehsil of Kasur is administratively subdivided into 55 Union Councils, these are:

See also
Kasur District

References

External links 
 Kasur Kasur website
 Kasur District Police website

Kasur District
Tehsils of Punjab, Pakistan